Paul McNicholas may refer to:
 Paul McNicholas (rugby league)
 Paul McNicholas (statistician)